Vickilyn Reynolds (born June 2, 1955 in Philadelphia, Pennsylvania) is an American film and television actress and singer.

Career
Reynolds first appeared on television in 1987 where she appeared on Kate & Allie, the following year (1988) she had appeared in two films, Crossing Delancey and I'm Gonna Git You Sucka. She also appeared in the movie Friday as Smokey's mother Joann. Reynolds has recently appeared on American Dreams in the episode "Beyond the Wire". She last appeared on television in 2005 where she played a talk show host in the film When Do We Eat?. Reynolds has also appeared on 227, a television show.

In 2003, Reynolds had appeared on a television commercial for the Saturn Corporation.

She is a member of Sigma Gamma Rho sorority. She played a role as Hattie McDaniel, the first African-American to win an Oscar and also member of Sigma Gamma Rho.

Filmography
 2005 When Do We Eat? as Talk Show Host
 2004 American Dreams (TV series)
 2003 Leprechaun: Back 2 tha Hood (V) as Doria
 2002 Felicity (TV series) as Nurse Jones
 2001 That's My Bush! (TV series) as Miss Clea #3
 2001 The Parkers (TV series) as Stephanie
 2001 Flossin as Bobbie
 1998 Primary Colors as Amalee
 1995 The John Larroquette Show (TV series) as Woman
 1995 Vampire in Brooklyn as Mrs. Brown
 1995 Friday as Joann
 1994 Murder Between Friends (Television)
 1993 Thea (TV series)
 1993 Addams Family Values as Forceps Nurse
 1992 South Central as Mrs. Manchester, Willie's Wife
 1992 Coopersmith (Television)
 1991 Great Performances (TV series) as LaWanda
 1990 Almost an Angel as Nancy, Bank Customer #1
 1990 Polly: Comin' Home! (Television)
 1990 Sugar and Spice (TV series) as Vickilyn Fontaine
 1989 The War of the Roses as Nancy, Oliver's Secretary
 1989 Polly (Television) as Mrs. Tarbell
 1989 Dad as CCU Nurse
 1989 The Fabulous Baker Boys as Bad Singer
 1989 227 (TV series) as Ranger Granger
 1988 I'm Gonna Git You Sucka as Sadie
 1988 Crossing Delancey as Woman In Sauna
 1987 Kate & Allie (TV series) as Gift Wrap Clerk

External links

 http://iforcolor.org/vickilyn-reynolds/

1955 births
African-American actresses
American film actresses
American television actresses
Living people
Actresses from Philadelphia
20th-century American actresses
21st-century American actresses
20th-century African-American women singers